Róbert Petrovický (born 26 October 1973) is a Slovak former professional ice hockey right winger. He played in the NHL for the Hartford Whalers, Dallas Stars, St. Louis Blues, Tampa Bay Lightning and the New York Islanders. In 2009/2010 season he played for Dinamo Riga in the Kontinental Hockey League.  He captained team Slovakia at the 2002 Winter Olympics.  Petrovicky was the last Hartford Whaler and Springfield Indian to be active in professional hockey.

Personal life
Robert's son, Rayen, is an ice hockey player for TUTO Hockey of the Mestis.

Career statistics

Regular season and playoffs

International

References

External links

                                                          

1973 births
Chicago Wolves (IHL) players
Czechoslovak ice hockey centres
Dallas Stars players
Detroit Vipers players
Dinamo Riga players
Grand Rapids Griffins (IHL) players
Hartford Whalers draft picks
Hartford Whalers players
HK Dukla Trenčín players
HC Ambrì-Piotta players
HC Kometa Brno players
HC Slavia Praha players
HC Vítkovice players
Ice hockey players at the 1994 Winter Olympics
Ice hockey players at the 1998 Winter Olympics
Ice hockey players at the 2002 Winter Olympics
Kalamazoo Wings (1974–2000) players
Leksands IF players
Living people
Modo Hockey players
National Hockey League first-round draft picks
New York Islanders players
Olympic ice hockey players of Slovakia
Sportspeople from Košice
SCL Tigers players
St. Louis Blues players
Slovak ice hockey centres
Slovakia men's national ice hockey team coaches
Springfield Falcons players
Springfield Indians players
Tampa Bay Lightning players
Worcester IceCats players
ZSC Lions players
Slovak expatriate ice hockey players in Sweden
Slovak expatriate ice hockey players in Switzerland
Slovak expatriate sportspeople in Latvia
Slovak expatriate ice hockey players in the Czech Republic
Slovak expatriate ice hockey players in the United States
Expatriate ice hockey players in Latvia
Slovak expatriate ice hockey players in Finland